"The Final Problem" is a short story by Sir Arthur Conan Doyle featuring his detective character Sherlock Holmes. It was first published in The Strand Magazine in the United Kingdom, and McClure's in the United States, under the title "The Adventure of the Final Problem" in December 1893. It appears in book form as part of the collection The Memoirs of Sherlock Holmes.

The story, set in 1891, introduces the criminal mastermind Professor Moriarty. It was intended to be the final Holmes story, ending with the character's death, but Conan Doyle was later persuaded to revive Holmes for additional stories and novels. 

Conan Doyle later ranked "The Final Problem" fourth on his personal list of the twelve best Holmes stories.

Plot summary
Holmes arrives at Dr. John Watson's residence one evening in a somewhat agitated state and with grazed and bleeding knuckles. Much to Watson's surprise and horror, Holmes had apparently escaped three separate murder attempts that day after a visit from Professor Moriarty, who warned Holmes to withdraw from his pursuit of justice against him to avoid any regrettable outcome. First, just as Holmes was turning a street corner, a cab suddenly rushed toward him and he just managed to leap out of the way in time. Second, while Holmes was walking along the street, a brick fell from the roof of a house, just missing the detective. He then called the police to search the whole area but could not prove that it was anything other than an accident. Finally, on his way to Watson's house, Holmes was attacked by a thug armed with a cosh. Holmes managed to overcome his assailant and handed him to the police but admitted that there was virtually no hope of proving that the man was in the employ of the criminal mastermind.

Holmes has been tracking Moriarty and his agents for months and is on the brink of snaring them all and delivering them to the dock. Moriarty is the criminal genius behind a highly organised and extremely secret criminal force and Holmes will consider it the crowning achievement of his career if he can defeat Moriarty. Moriarty is out to thwart Holmes's plans and is well capable of doing so, for he is, as Holmes admits, the great detective's intellectual equal.

Holmes asks Watson to come to the continent with him, giving him unusual instructions designed to hide his tracks to the boat train at Victoria station. Holmes is not quite sure where they will go, which seems rather odd to Watson. Holmes, certain that he has been followed to his friend's house, then makes off by climbing over the back wall in the garden. The next day Watson follows Holmes's instructions to the letter and finds himself waiting in the reserved first-class coach for his friend, but only an elderly Italian priest is there. The cleric soon makes it apparent that he is, in fact, Holmes in disguise.

As the boat train pulls out of Victoria, Holmes spots Moriarty on the platform, making gestures in an unsuccessful attempt to stop the train. Holmes is forced to take action as Moriarty has obviously tracked Watson, despite extraordinary precautions. Holmes and Watson alight at Canterbury, making a change to their planned route. As they are waiting for another train to Newhaven a special one-coach train roars through Canterbury, as Holmes suspected it would. It contains the professor, who has hired the train in an effort to overtake Holmes. Holmes and Watson are forced to hide behind luggage.

Having made their way to Strasbourg via Brussels, the following Monday Holmes receives a message that most of Moriarty's gang have been arrested in England and recommends Watson return there now, as the detective will likely prove to be a very dangerous companion. Watson, however, decides to stay with his friend. Moriarty himself has slipped out of the grasp of the English police and is obviously with them on the continent.

Holmes and Watson's journey takes them to Switzerland where they stay at Meiringen. From there they fatefully decide to take a walk which will include a visit to the Reichenbach Falls, a local natural wonder. Once there, a boy appears and hands Watson a letter, saying that there is a sick Englishwoman back at the hotel who wants an English doctor. Holmes realises at once it is a hoax although he does not say so. Watson goes to see about the patient, leaving Holmes by himself.

Upon returning to the Englischer Hof, Watson finds that the innkeeper has no knowledge of any sick Englishwoman. Realising at last that he has been deceived, he rushes back to the Reichenbach Falls but finds no one there, although he does see two sets of footprints going out onto the muddy dead end path with none returning. There is also a note from Holmes, explaining that he knew the report Watson was given to be a hoax and that he is about to fight Moriarty, who has graciously given him enough time to pen this last letter. Watson sees that towards the end of the path there are signs that a violent struggle has taken place and there are no returning footprints. It is all too clear Holmes and Moriarty have both fallen to their deaths down the gorge while locked in mortal combat. Saddened, Dr. Watson returns to England. The Moriarty gang are all convicted on the strength of evidence secured by Holmes. Watson ends his narrative by saying that Sherlock Holmes was the best and the wisest man he had ever known.

Background

"The Final Problem" was intended to be exactly what its name says. Conan Doyle meant to stop writing about his famous detective after this short story; he felt the Sherlock Holmes stories were distracting him from more serious literary efforts and that "killing" Holmes off was the only way of getting his career back on track. "I must save my mind for better things," he wrote to his mother, "even if it means I must bury my pocketbook with him."

Conan Doyle sought to sweeten the pill by letting Holmes go in a blaze of glory, having him rid the world of a criminal so powerful and dangerous that any further task would be trivial in comparison; indeed, Holmes says as much in the story.

In 1893, Conan Doyle and his wife toured Switzerland and discovered the village of Meiringen in the Bernese Alps. This experience fired Conan Doyle's imagination.

Publication history
The story was published in the UK in The Strand Magazine in December 1893, and in the US in McClure's in the same month. It was also published in the US edition of The Strand Magazine in January 1894. It was published with nine illustrations by Sidney Paget in the Strand, and with eleven illustrations by Harry C. Edwards in McClure's. It was included in  The Memoirs of Sherlock Holmes, which was published in December 1893 in the UK and February 1894 in the US.

Reaction
In an article published by the BBC, Jennifer Keishin Armstrong noted that "The public reaction to the death was unlike anything previously seen for fictional events."  The Strand Magazine "barely survived" the resulting rush of subscription cancellations. There were some stories that "young men throughout London wore black mourning crêpes on their hats or around their arms for the month of Holmes’ death" although these may have been exaggerations propounded by Doyle's son. Armstrong continues, "Readers typically accepted what went on in their favourite books, then moved on. Now they were beginning to take their popular culture personally, and to expect their favourite works to conform to certain expectations."

Pressure from fans eventually persuaded Doyle to bring Holmes back, writing The Hound of the Baskervilles (set before "The Final Problem") and reviving him in "The Adventure of the Empty House". There were enough holes in eyewitness accounts to allow Doyle to plausibly resurrect Holmes; only the few free surviving members of Moriarty's organisation and Holmes' brother Mycroft (who appears briefly in this story) know that Sherlock Holmes is still alive, having won the struggle at the Reichenbach Falls and sent Moriarty to his doom—though nearly meeting his own at the hands of one of Moriarty's henchmen.

Influence and legacy

Inhabitants of Meiringen are still grateful to Doyle and Holmes for ensuring the enduring worldwide fame of their falls and considerably promoting tourism to the town.

A museum dedicated to Holmes is housed in the basement of the English Church, located in what has now been named Conan Doyle Place. 

At the funicular station near the falls, there is a memorial plate to "the most famous detective in the world".

The actual ledge from which Moriarty fell is on the other side of the falls. It is accessible by climbing the path to the top of the falls, crossing the bridge, and following the trail down the hill. The ledge is marked by a plaque written in English, German, and French. The English inscription reads "At this fearful place, Sherlock Holmes vanquished Professor Moriarty, on 4 May 1891." It is also marked by a large cross so as to be visible from the viewing platform.

Fans who call themselves "pilgrims" travel to Meiringen dressed as characters, both major and minor, from the Holmes stories. There, they take part in a reenactment of the events of "The Final Problem" organized by the Sherlock Holmes Society of London.

Adaptations

Film

"The Final Problem" was adapted as a 1923 silent short film as part of the Stoll film series, starring Eille Norwood as Holmes and Hubert Willis as Watson, with Percy Standing as Moriarty.

The 1931 film The Sleeping Cardinal, the first film in the 1931–1937 film series starring Arthur Wontner as Holmes, is based in part on "The Adventure of the Empty House" and "The Final Problem." The scene from "The Final Problem" in which Moriarty confronts Holmes at Baker Street and attempts to persuade Holmes to stop his investigations is used in The Triumph of Sherlock Holmes (1935), another film in the series.

In the 1939–1946 film series starring Basil Rathbone as Holmes and Nigel Bruce as Watson, a number of films borrow elements from "The Final Problem". Most noticeable of these elements are the methods of killing Moriarty off; in The Adventures of Sherlock Holmes (1939), Sherlock Holmes and the Secret Weapon (1942) and The Woman in Green (1945), Moriarty is seen in all three films falling from a great height to his death. The Woman in Green contains a variation on the conversation between Holmes and Moriarty in Baker Street, as well as the idea of Moriarty manipulating Watson out of the way by hoaxing an injured Englishwoman who requires his treating.

The 2011 film Sherlock Holmes: A Game of Shadows is based in part on "The Final Problem". Like the story, it ends with Holmes and Moriarty plummeting into the falls, and Watson is shown writing the final sentences of "The Final Problem" on his typewriter. However, in the film, the characters are attending a European Peace Conference held near the falls which Moriarty seeks to sabotage, and the two plunge down from a balcony overlooking the falls rather than from the ledge of the original story. Holmes is also shown falling over the edge with Moriarty rather than simply being assumed to have fallen, being too injured to defeat Moriarty in a straight fight but knowing that Moriarty will go after Watson if he lives. While Holmes is shown to have survived, having used his brother's oxygen inhaler to survive the water at the bottom of the falls, Moriarty's fate is less certain.

Television

The Soviet television film series The Adventures of Sherlock Holmes and Dr. Watson (1979–1986) adapted "The Final Problem" as "The Deadly Fight" (and "The Adventure in the Empty House" as "Hunt for the Tiger").

In the television series Sherlock Holmes starring Jeremy Brett, the 1985 episode based on the story begins with the theft of the Mona Lisa, masterminded by Moriarty in order to sell prepared fakes to collectors. Holmes recovers the original painting just before Moriarty makes a sale to a "Mr. Morgan". Holmes's interference with his plans convinces Moriarty that the detective must be eliminated, and Holmes is subsequently presumed to have died in a tumble down the Reichenbach Falls. This was the last episode to star David Burke as Dr. Watson. Burke was replaced by Edward Hardwicke until the end of the show's run, starting with the adaptation of "The Empty House" which acted as the first episode of The Return of Sherlock Holmes.

The BraveStarr episode "Sherlock Holmes in the 23rd Century" begins with a revised version of the climax of "The Final Problem", in which only Holmes plummets down Reichenbach Falls, but instead of falling to his doom, he falls into a natural time warp that transports him into the year 2249. 

The first episode of the animated television series Sherlock Holmes in the 22nd Century (1999–2001) begins with the climax of "The Final Problem" where it was later revealed in the second episode that while Holmes managed to survive the fall by grabbing a tree branch and would go on to solve many more cases (later being entombed in honey upon his death of old age, which preserved his body enough to be revitalized in the 22nd century), Moriarty had indeed parished and was buried by Holmes himself, preserved in ice in a freezing cave. Holmes, the robotic Watson and Inspector Beth Lestrade later visit the burial site at Reichenbach Falls to confirm Moriarty's death upon news of a lookalike causing a crime spree in New London. Upon seeing a drill hole in the ice, Holmes surmises that the new Moriarty is in fact a clone with all the original's memories and skills.

The two part six season finale of Monk, "Mr. Monk is on the Run" (2008), is loosely inspired by both "The Final Problem and "The Empty House." Adrian Monk is supposedly shot over a pier after being accused of murder, only to be alive in the second part. The orchestrator is revealed to be Dale "the Whale" Biederbeck, described as "the Genghis Khan of world finance," much like Moriarty as "the Napoleon of Crime."

Episode three of the first season of BBC's Sherlock, titled The Great Game shows a variation of the part where Moriarty confronts Holmes at Baker Street in the story. The story is also the basis of the episode "The Reichenbach Fall"(Season 3, Episode 3), which first aired on 15 January 2012 and shows Holmes falling from the roof of St Bartholomew's Hospital in London, supposedly leading to his death. Throughout a confrontation between Sherlock and Jim Moriarty in Baker Street, Moriarty repeatedly utters the phrase "the final problem". The special episode of Sherlock, "The Abominable Bride", which was broadcast on 1 January 2016, featured a re-creation of the showdown between Sherlock and Moriarty set in Victorian times, as depicted in the book. The 2017 series finale of Sherlock is named for this story, but bears little to no resemblance to the canon.

The 2012 series finale of the American medical drama House—which was inspired by the Sherlock Holmes stories—sees Dr. Gregory House fake his own death, in an ode to "The Final Problem".

The 2013 Russian television series Sherlock Holmes adapted "The Final Problem" as "Holmes' Last Case".

The 2018 HBO Asia/Hulu Japan series Miss Sherlock loosely adapts this story for its series finale "The Dock." In this version, the famous scene at the Reichenbach Falls is replaced by an analogous scene set at a fictional "Reichenbach Building" in Tokyo.

The 2019 penultimate episode (Season 7 Episode 12) of the CBS adaptation of Sherlock Holmes, Elementary, was titled "Reichenbach Falls", and portrayed Sherlock's ploy to bring down a powerful serial killer billionaire, Odin Reichenbach. Holmes fakes his death on a bridge, which puts Odin Reichenbach under investigation for the murder of Sherlock Holmes and thereby exposes Reichenbach's past crimes.

Radio
"The Final Problem" was loosely adapted for multiple episodes of the American radio series The Adventures of Sherlock Holmes starring Richard Gordon as Sherlock Holmes and Leigh Lovell as Dr. Watson, including episodes titled "Murder in the Waxworks" (March 1932), "The Adventure of the Ace of Spades" (May 1932), and "Murder by Proxy" (January 1933).

The story was later adapted for radio by John Kier Cross; it was broadcast on the BBC Light Programme in December 1954 and starred John Gielgud as Holmes and Ralph Richardson as Dr. Watson, with Orson Welles as Professor Moriarty. The production was also broadcast on NBC radio on 17 April 1955.

Felix Felton adapted the story as a radio adaptation which aired on the BBC Home Service in March 1955 as part of the 1952–1969 radio series starring Carleton Hobbs as Holmes and Norman Shelley as Watson, with Ralph Truman as Moriarty. Another dramatisation of the story adapted by Felton aired on the BBC Home Service in November 1957, again starring Hobbs and Shelley, with Felton playing Moriarty. Hobbs and Shelley also starred as Holmes and Watson in a 1967 BBC Light Programme adaptation of the story which was adapted by Michael Hardwick.

"The Final Problem" was dramatized for BBC Radio 4 in 1992 by Bert Coules as part of the 1989–1998 radio series starring Clive Merrison as Holmes and Michael Williams as Watson. It featured Michael Pennington as Professor Moriarty, Frederick Treves as Colonel Moran, Sean Arnold as Inspector Patterson, Terence Edmond as Steiler, Richard Pearce as Jenkinson, and Norman Jones as Sir George.

An episode of The Classic Adventures of Sherlock Holmes, a series on the American radio show Imagination Theatre, combined "The Final Problem" with the events of "The Empty House". The episode, titled "The Return of Sherlock Holmes", aired in 2009, and starred John Patrick Lowrie as Holmes and Lawrence Albert as Watson.

Other media
William Gillette's 1899 stage play Sherlock Holmes is based on several stories, among them "The Final Problem." Films released in 1916 (starring Gillette as Holmes) and 1922 (starring John Barrymore), both titled Sherlock Holmes, were based on the play, as well as a 1938 Mercury Theatre on the Air radio adaptation titled The Immortal Sherlock Holmes, starring Orson Welles as Holmes, although in none of these retellings do Holmes die (and indeed in the two film versions he marries).

In 1975, DC Comics published Sherlock Holmes #1, a comic book which adapted both "The Final Problem" and "The Adventure of the Empty House". It was intended to be an ongoing series, but future issues were canceled due to low sales.

The 1999 comic series The League of Extraordinary Gentlemen, Volume One by Alan Moore and Kevin O'Neill briefly adapts "The Final Problem" in issue #5 and shows Holmes triumphing over Moriarty and climbing the cliff, although Moriarty survives as well. The film adaptation references these events, but does not show them; the novelization copies the event almost verbatim from the graphic novel.

An arc of the Japanese manga series Moriarty the Patriot, a series featuring a young Moriarty as a crime consultant, is named after the Japanese translation of the story's title. The final two episodes, "The Final Problem Act 1" and "The Final Problem Act 2", feature Sherlock and William (Moriarty) falling from Tower Bridge to River Thames, though revealed that both of them are alive and in Switzerland.

References
Notes

Sources

External links

Sherlock Holmes short stories by Arthur Conan Doyle
1893 short stories
Works originally published in The Strand Magazine
Works originally published in McClure's
Short stories adapted into films